The hijackers in the September 11 attacks  were 19 men affiliated with the militant Islamist group al-Qaeda. They hailed from four countries; 15 of them were citizens of Saudi Arabia, two were from the United Arab Emirates, one was from Egypt, and one from Lebanon. To carry out the attacks, the hijackers were organized into four teams, each led by a pilot-trained hijacker who would commandeer the flight with three or four "muscle hijackers" who were trained to help subdue the pilots, passengers, and crew. Each team was assigned to a different flight and given a unique target to crash their respective planes into.

The first hijackers to arrive in the United States were Khalid al-Mihdhar and Nawaf al-Hazmi, who settled in San Diego County, California, in January 2000. They were followed by three hijacker-pilots, Mohamed Atta, Marwan al-Shehhi, and Ziad Jarrah in mid-2000 to undertake flight training in South Florida. The fourth hijacker-pilot, Hani Hanjour, arrived in San Diego in December 2000. The rest of the "muscle hijackers" arrived in early- and mid-2001.

Selection

Khalid al-Mihdhar and Nawaf al-Hazmi were both experienced and respected jihadists in the eyes of al-Qaeda leader Osama bin Laden.

As for the pilots who would go on to participate in the attacks, three of them were original members of the Hamburg cell (Mohamed Atta, Marwan al-Shehhi and Ziad Jarrah). Following their training at al-Qaeda training camps in Afghanistan, they were chosen by Bin Laden and al-Qaeda's military wing due to their extensive knowledge of western culture and language skills, increasing the mission's operational security and its chances for success. The fourth intended pilot, Ramzi bin al-Shibh, a member of the Hamburg cell, was also chosen to participate in the attacks yet was unable to obtain a visa for entry into the United States. He was later replaced by Hani Hanjour, a Saudi national.

Al-Mihdhar and al-Hazmi were also potential pilot hijackers but did not do well in their initial pilot lessons in San Diego. Both were kept on as "muscle" hijackers, who would help overpower the passengers and crew and allow the pilot hijackers to take control of the flights. In addition to al-Mihdhar and al-Hazmi, 13 other muscle hijackers were selected in late 2000 or early 2001. All were from Saudi Arabia, with the exception of Fayez Banihammad, who was from the United Arab Emirates.

Shortly after the attacks the FBI concluded that the majority of the "muscle" hijackers did not know that they were on a suicide mission, as unlike the pilots they had not prepared last wills and testaments or given other indications that they expected their lives to end. According to an audio recording of Osama Bin Laden from 2001, the "muscle" hijackers were not in contact with the pilot hijackers and were not told the true nature of their mission until the day of the attacks.

Hijackers
Names in bold indicate the hijacker-pilot of the flight.

Hijacked aircraft

American Airlines Flight 11: One World Trade Center, North Tower

 N.B.: Bold text notes the hijackers who piloted the planes.

Hijackers: Mohamed Atta (Egyptian), Abdulaziz al-Omari (Saudi Arabian), Wail al-Shehri (Saudi Arabian), Waleed al-Shehri (Saudi Arabian), Satam al-Suqami (Saudi Arabian).

Two flight attendants called the American Airlines reservation desk during the hijacking. Betty Ong reported that "the five hijackers had come from first-class seats: 2A, 2B, 9A, 9C and 9B." Flight attendant Amy Sweeney called a flight services manager at Logan Airport in Boston and described them as Middle Eastern. She gave the staff the seat numbers and they pulled up the ticket and credit card information of the hijackers, identifying Mohamed Atta.

Mohamed Atta's voice was heard over the air traffic control system, broadcasting messages thought to be intended for the passengers.

United Airlines Flight 175: Two World Trade Center, South Tower

Hijackers: Marwan al-Shehhi (United Arab Emirates), Fayez Banihammad (United Arab Emirates), Mohand al-Shehri (Saudi Arabian), Hamza al-Ghamdi (Saudi Arabian), Ahmed al-Ghamdi (Saudi Arabian).

A United Airlines mechanic was called by a flight attendant who stated the crew had been murdered and the plane hijacked.

American Airlines Flight 77: Pentagon

Hijackers: Hani Hanjour (Saudi Arabian), Khalid al-Mihdhar (Saudi Arabian), Majed Moqed (Saudi Arabian), Nawaf al-Hazmi (Saudi Arabian), Salem al-Hazmi (Saudi Arabian).

Two hijackers, Hani Hanjour and Majed Moqed were identified by clerks as having bought single, first-class tickets for Flight 77 from Advance Travel Service in Totowa, New Jersey with $1,842.25 in cash.

Renee May, a flight attendant on Flight 77, used a cell phone to call her mother in Las Vegas. She said her flight was being hijacked by six individuals who had moved them to the rear of the plane. Unlike the other flights, there was no report of stabbings or bomb threats. According to the 9/11 Commission Report, it is possible that pilots were not stabbed to death and were sent to the rear of the plane. One of the hijackers, most likely Hanjour, announced on the intercom that the flight had been hijacked.
Passenger Barbara Olson called her husband, Theodore Olson, the Solicitor General of the United States, stating the flight had been hijacked and the hijackers had knives and box cutters.

Two of the passengers had been on the FBI's terrorist-alert list: Khalid al-Mihdhar and Nawaf al-Hazmi. Al-Mihdhar and Nawaf al-Hazmi flew to Los Angeles in January 2000 and later took flying lessons in San Diego, during which time they were allegedly assisted by Omar al-Bayoumi and Saudi diplomats Fahad al-Thumairy and Mussaed Ahmed al-Jarrah.

United Airlines Flight 93: Shanksville, Pennsylvania

Hijackers: Ziad Jarrah (Lebanese), Ahmed al-Haznawi (Saudi Arabian), Ahmed al-Nami (Saudi Arabian), Saeed al-Ghamdi (Saudi Arabian).

Passenger Jeremy Glick stated that the hijackers were Arabic-looking, wearing red headbands, and carrying knives.

Spoken messages (from Ziad Jarrah) intended for passengers were mistakenly broadcast over the air traffic control system.

Jarrah is also heard on the cockpit voice recorder. In addition, DNA samples submitted by his girlfriend were matched to remains recovered in Shanksville.

Investigation

Before the attacks

Before the attacks, FBI agent Robert Wright, Jr. had written vigorous criticisms of FBI's alleged incompetence in investigating terrorists residing within the United States. Wright was part of the Bureau's Chicago counter-terrorism task force and involved in project Vulgar Betrayal, which was linked to Yasin al-Qadi.

According to James Bamford, the NSA had picked up communications of al-Mihdhar and al-Hazmi back in 1999, but had been hampered by internal bureaucratic conflicts between itself and the CIA, and did not do a full analysis of the information it passed on to the agency. For example, it only passed on the first names, Nawaf and Khalid.

Bamford also claims that the CIA's Alec Station (a unit assigned to bin Laden) knew that al-Mihdhar was planning to come to New York as far back as January 2000. Doug Miller, one of three FBI agents working inside the CIA station, tried to send a message (a CIR) to the FBI to alert them about this, so they could put al-Mihdhar on a watch list. His CIA boss, Tom Wilshire, deputy station chief, allegedly denied permission to Miller. Miller asked his associate Mark Rossini for advice; Rossini pressed Wilshire's deputy but was rebuffed also.

Bamford also claims that al-Mihdhar and Hazmi wound up living with Abdussattar Shaikh for a time to save money. Shaikh was, coincidentally, an FBI informant, but since they never acted suspiciously around him, he never reported them. The CIA Bangkok station told Alec Station that Hazmi had gone to Los Angeles. None of this information made it back to the FBI headquarters.

Attacks
Within minutes of the attacks, the Federal Bureau of Investigation opened the largest FBI investigation in United States history, operation PENTTBOM. The suspects were identified within 72 hours because few made any attempt to disguise their names on flight and credit card records. They were also among the few non-US citizens and nearly the only passengers with Arabic names on their flights, enabling the FBI to identify them using such details as dates of birth, known or possible residences, visa status, and specific identification of the suspected pilots. On September 27, 2001, the FBI released photos of the 19 hijackers, along with information about many of their possible nationalities and aliases. The suspected hijackers were from Saudi Arabia (15 hijackers), United Arab Emirates (two hijackers), Lebanon (one hijacker) and Egypt (one hijacker).

The passport of Satam al-Suqami was reportedly recovered "a few blocks from where the World Trade Center's twin towers once stood"; a passerby picked it up and gave it to an NYPD detective shortly before the towers collapsed. The passports of two other hijackers, Ziad Jarrah and Saeed al-Ghamdi, were recovered from the crash site of United Airlines Flight 93 in Pennsylvania, and a fourth passport, that of Abdulaziz al-Omari was recovered from luggage that did not make it onto American Airlines Flight 11.

According to the 9/11 Commission Report, 26 al-Qaeda terrorist conspirators sought to enter the United States to carry out a suicide mission. In the end, the FBI reported that there were 19 hijackers in all: five on three of the flights, and four on the fourth. On September 14, three days after the attacks, the FBI announced the names of 19 persons. After a controversy about an earlier remark, U.S. Homeland Security Secretary Janet Napolitano stated in May 2009 that the 9/11 Commission found that none of the hijackers entered the United States through Canada.

Nawaf al-Hazmi and Hani Hanjour, attended the Dar al-Hijrah Falls Church, Virginia, Islamic Center where the Imam Anwar al-Awlaki preached, in early April 2001. Through interviews with the FBI, it was discovered that Awlaki had previously met Nawaf al-Hazmi several times while the two lived in San Diego. At the time, Hazmi was living with Khalid al-Mihdhar, another 9/11 hijacker. The hijackers of the same plane often had very strong ties as many of them attended school together or lived together prior to the attacks.

Possible cases of mistaken identity
Soon after the attacks and before the FBI had released the pictures of all the hijackers, several reports claimed some of the men named as hijackers on 9/11 were alive and had their identities stolen.

See also
 20th hijacker
 Justice Against Sponsors of Terrorism Act

Notes and references

Notes

References

External links
 , September 27, 2001.

2001 suicides
Al-Qaeda members
Articles containing video clips
Filmed suicides
Hijackers
Mohamed Atta